Charles James Francis Sinclair    (born 4 April 1948) is a British businessman. He is the chairman of Associated British Foods.

Early life
Charles James Francis Sinclair, only son of Sir George Sinclair and Katharine Jane Burdekin, was born on 4 April 1948. He attended Winchester College and graduated from Magdalen College, Oxford.

Career
Sinclair joined the Daily Mail and General Trust in 1975. He was its chief executive officer (CEO) from 1989 to September 2008. He was on the board of directors of the Euromoney Institutional Investor from November 1985 to September 2008, of Thomson Reuters from January 1994 to December 2005, of The Thomson Corporation until December 2005, of Schroders from 1990 to April 2004. He joined the board of directors of Associated British Foods in October 2008 and became its chairman in April 2009. He also sat on the board of directors of SVG Capital since January 2005. He is a Fellow of the Institute of Chartered Accountants in England and Wales.

Sinclair is chairman of the board of trustees of the Minack Theatre in Porthcurno, Cornwall. Sinclair replaced David Clementi as warden of Winchester College in 2014.

Personal life
Sinclair married Nicola Bayliss in 1974. They have two sons. He is a member of the Athenaeum Club, the Flyfishers' Club and Vincent's Club.

References

1948 births
Living people
People educated at Winchester College
Alumni of Magdalen College, Oxford
Daily Mail and General Trust people
Thomson Reuters people
Associated British Foods people
Commanders of the Order of the British Empire
British accountants
Schroders people
Wardens of Winchester College